C. Herbert Oliver (February 28, 1925 – November 30, 2021) was an American pastor and civil rights activist.

An ordained Orthodox Presbyterian Church minister, Oliver was a graduate of Wheaton College in Illinois and Westminster Theological Seminary.

References

1925 births
2021 deaths
American civil rights activists